Skrat is a village in Petrich Municipality, Blagoevgrad Province, in south-western Bulgaria.

References

Villages in Blagoevgrad Province